Daniel J. Mahoney  (March 20, 1864 – January 31, 1904) was a professional baseball player in the Major Leagues during 1892 and 1895.

Death
On January 31, 1904, Mahoney committed suicide by drinking carbolic acid in Springfield, Massachusetts. He was 39 years old.

External links

1864 births
1904 suicides
Baseball players from Massachusetts
Cincinnati Reds players
Washington Senators (1891–1899) players
Major League Baseball catchers
19th-century baseball players
Boston Blues players
Manchester Maroons players
St. Joseph Clay Eaters players
Quincy Ravens players
Joliet Convicts players
Binghamton Bingoes players
Suicides in Massachusetts
Suicides by poison